Andrew Dean Morris (born 17 November 1967) is a retired footballer. He currently works as Chesterfield's Football in the Community Officer, having replaced Nicky Law in summer 2000. He played his last competitive football for Hucknall Town.

He was nicknamed "Bruno" by Chesterfield fans for an alleged resemblance to the British boxer, Frank Bruno.

He is most fondly remembered at Saltergate, where urban legend states he arrived from Rotherham for a fee of £500 and a bag of footballs. In the 1996–97 season, Morris was part of Chesterfield's historic FA Cup semi finalists – scoring the first goal in the semi final at Old Trafford against Middlesbrough, and winning a penalty for the second.

The following season, Andy Morris was granted a testimonial match versus Nottingham Forest. Due to persistent injury problems, he left Saltergate shortly after and negotiated a contract with Rochdale.

Morris ended his time as a player at Hucknall Town but returned to Chesterfield in 2000 in order to become the club's Football in the Community Manager, and this is a position he still occupies.

References

External links
 
 Andy Morris at Chesterfield F.C. website
 BBC interview with Andy Morris

1967 births
Rotherham United F.C. players
Chesterfield F.C. players
Exeter City F.C. players
Rochdale A.F.C. players
Scarborough F.C. players
Hucknall Town F.C. players
Footballers from Sheffield
English footballers
English Football League players
National League (English football) players
Association football forwards
Living people